Petalostoma kuibis is a species of enigmatic fossil organism from the Ediacaran period, possibly a member of the Petalonamae, of Namibia, Dabris Formation, Farm Aar.

Description
P. kuibis represents a multitude of saucer-shaped structures which are up to tens of cm in diameter, while also showing an irregularly wrinkled surface on the fossils collected from the Farm Aar of Namibia. Another feature P. kuibis also has is a lack of any indications that it had internal cavities.

Theoretical importance
Because P. kuibis has been observed in its irregular granule microstructures, it is believed that fossil specimens of this organism may be able to, and have been used to, construct complex models of colonies with in the phylum Petalonamae, signifying that it has an important role in reconstructing those animals.

See also

 List of Ediacaran genera

References

Ediacaran
Ediacaran life
Precambrian
Precambrian life
Aquatic animals
Enigmatic prehistoric animal genera
Petalonamae
Fossil taxa described in 1973
Precambrian Africa
Fossils of Namibia